American Quilt is a 2021 studio album by American pop and rock singer Paula Cole.

Recording and release
After releasing a collection of jazz ballads in Cole considered a second album of musical standards, but felt that the political climate in the United States warranted new material that reflected the necessity of "finding empathy" during political turmoil. She delayed that work until 2021 with American Quilt, focusing on Tin Pan Alley, folk, and Americana roots music, which is the style of music she was raised with. She wanted this album to display more diversity in style and genre than her jazz release and spent time during the COVID-19 pandemic finalizing the album, including doing research on songs and American folk art, such as quilts. Cole expressed that she still desires writing new music, but also wanted to continue exploring Americana after recording American Quilt, including the musical heritage from her father, a polka musician.

Reception
The editors of AllMusic Guide scored American Quilt 3.5 out of five stars, with reviewer Stephen Thomas Erlewine noting the challenges of balancing all of the musical influences into one coherent musical statement, summing up that "it's just enough to be fresh yet familiar, the slight left turns indeed drawing attention to commonalities instead of differences".

Track listing
Several editions of American Quilt have been released with slightly varying track listing among the following tracks: 
"You Don't Know What Love Is" (Gene De Paul and Don Raye) – 5:58
"God's Gonna Cut You Down" (Johnny Cash) – 2:56
"Wayfaring Stranger" (traditional) – 4:36
"Shenandoah" (traditional) – 7:41
"Black Mountain Blues" (J. C. Johnson) – 5:08
"Good Morning Heartache" (Ervin M. Drake, Dan Fisher, and Irene Higginbotham) – 4:21
"Nobody Knows You (When You're Down and Out)" (Jimmie Cox) – 3:10
"Bye Bye Blackbird" (Mort Dixon and Ray Henderson) – 4:28
"Steal Away" / "Hidden in Plain Sight" (traditional / Paula Cole) – 7:55
"What a Wonderful World" (Bob Thiele and George David Weiss) – 2:55

Personnel
"You Don’t Know What Love Is"
Paula Cole – vocals, production
Consuelo Candelaria Barry – piano
Kevin Barry – guitar, guitar solo
Jay Bellerose – drums
Dennis Crouch – double bass
"God’s Gonna Cut You Down"
Paula Cole – vocals, production
Kevin Barry – acoustic guitar
Jay Bellerose – drums
Chris Bruce – electric guitar, guitar drone
Dennis Crouch – double bass
Darcel Wilson – vocals
"Wayfaring Stranger"
Paula Cole – piano, vocals, arrangement, production
Kevin Barry – acoustic guitar
Jay Bellerose – drums
Ross Gallagher – double bass
Kathleen Parks – fiddle, solo
"Shenandoah"
Paula Cole – piano, vocals, vocal arrangement, production
Jay Bellerose – drums
Ross Gallagher – double bass
Kevin Barry – lap steel guitar
Seamus Egan – tin whistle, solo
Peter Eldridge – baritone vocals, tenor vocals
Darcel Wilson – alto vocals, soprano vocals
"Black Mountain Blues"
Paula Cole – vocals, production
Jay Bellerose – drums
Ross Gallagher – double bass
Kevin Barry – acoustic guitar, guitar solo
Kathleen Parks – fiddle, solo
"Good Morning Heartache"
Paula Cole – clarinet, vocals, production
Jay Bellerose – drums
Consuelo Candelaria Barry – electric Wurlitzer piano
Chris Bruce – acoustic guitar
Dennis Crouch – double bass
"Nobody Knows You (When You’re Down and Out)"
Paula Cole – whistling, vocals, production
Kevin Barry – electric guitar, guitar solo
Jay Bellerose – drums
Chris Bruce – rhythm guitar
Dennis Crouch – double bass
Consuelo Candelaria Barry – piano
Liz Lee – trombone
"Bye Bye Blackbird"
Paula Cole – finger snaps, vocals, production
Kevin Barry – electric guitar, guitar solo
Ross Gallagher – double bass
"Steal Away" / "Hidden In Plain Sight"
Paula Cole – clarinet, vocals, production
Jay Bellerose – drums
Chris Bruce – acoustic and electric guitar
Keefus Ciancia – sound landscape and sound design
Dennis Crouch – double bass
"What a Wonderful World"
Paula Cole – piano, vocals, production
Kevin Barry – acoustic guitar
Jay Bellerose – drums
Ross Gallagher – double bass

Technical personnel
Sarah Bryant-Cole – artistic design input
Michael Lau-Robles – design and production at 2310 Design
Tim Llewllyn – quilt photography
Gavin Lurssen – mastering at Lurssen Mastering
Mary Maurer – art direction, design at 2310 Design
Mike Piersante – mixing
Chris Rival – engineering
Ebru Yildiz – photography

See also
List of 2021 albums

References

External links

Review from The Bluegrass Situation
Review from New Folk Initiative

2021 albums
Paula Cole albums
Covers albums
Folk albums by American artists